The following are the list of Indonesian diplomats that served as Ambassador of the Republic of Indonesia to the United Kingdom of Great Britain and Northern Ireland.

See also 
 List of Indonesian ambassadors
 List of diplomatic missions of Indonesia
 Embassy of the United Kingdom, Jakarta
 Foreign relations of the United Kingdom
 List of ambassadors of the United Kingdom to Indonesia
 Indonesia–United Kingdom relations

References

External links 
 Indonesian Ambassadors to the United Kingdom

United Kingdom
 
Indonesia